Thunderbird Strike is a side-scrolling video game created by Elizabeth LaPensée. In this game the player controls Thunderbird, a legendary creature from the mythology of some North American indigenous peoples, which flies from the Alberta tar sands to the Great Lakes, and along the way attempts to destroy oil industry infrastructure and equipment while trying to revive dead wildlife. LaPensée says the game is a protest about pipeline construction on Indigenous land, while telling stories from her culture and encouraging players to take care of Turtle Island.

The games is available for Microsoft Windows, Android and iOS.

Reception
The game won the Best Digital Media Work award at the 2017 imagineNATIVE Film + Media Arts Festival.

It was criticised by the pipe-line advocacy group Energy Builders as having been designed to encourage eco-terrorism. The game had received funding from the Minnesota State Arts Board and the Arrowhead Regional Arts Council, and Minnesota state senator David Osmek called for an investigation into the $4,000 funding.

References

External links
Thunderbird Strike

2017 video games
Android (operating system) games
Environmental education video games
IOS games
Side-scrolling video games
Video games about birds
Video games based on Native American mythology
Video games developed in the United States
Video games set on islands
Video games set in Canada
Video games set in the United States
Windows games